Ashraf Helmy (born 24 April 1967) is an Egyptian table tennis player. He competed at the 1988 Summer Olympics, the 1992 Summer Olympics, and the 2000 Summer Olympics.

He was mentioned in S4 E8 of the American version of The Office as one of the heroes of the character Dwight Shrute

References

1967 births
Living people
Egyptian male table tennis players
Olympic table tennis players of Egypt
Table tennis players at the 1988 Summer Olympics
Table tennis players at the 1992 Summer Olympics
Table tennis players at the 2000 Summer Olympics
Sportspeople from Cairo